Kebineng (died 235) was a Xianbei chieftain who lived during the late Eastern Han dynasty and Three Kingdoms period of China. He rose to power during the late Eastern Han dynasty after the warlord Cao Cao defeated the Wuhuan tribes in northern China at the Battle of White Wolf Mountain in 207. He was ultimately assassinated by Cao Wei forces in 235.

Life
When the Wuhuan chieftain Tadun lost to the warlord Cao Cao at the Battle of White Wolf Mountain in 207, Kebineng and several other Xianbei tribal leaders decided to pay tribute to the Han imperial court, then under Cao Cao's control. Because of this deed, Kebineng and these other chiefs were given kingly status. According to the Zizhi Tongjian, Kebineng was a just, honest and charismatic man who managed to win the support of most of the Xianbei tribes. Kebineng's greatest rival was another Xianbei chief, Budugen. After Kebineng lured Budugen's brother into a trap and killed him, Budugen and Kebineng waged war against each other incessantly. Budugen's clan weakened in strength from this fighting, while the power of Kebineng's faction grew greatly, in part due to support from the Chinese Three Kingdoms-era state of Cao Wei. 

After Budugen went to the Han imperial court to offer tribute, Kebineng decided to attack the eastern branch of the Xianbei. The Han imperial court deemed Kebineng a threat and ordered Tian Yu, the Han-appointed protector of the Wuhuan, to lead Han imperial forces to attack Kebineng's rear while Kebineng was away attacking the eastern branch of the Xianbei. After this incident, relations between the Xianbei tribes under Kebineng's leadership and the Eastern Han dynasty (and later the state of Cao Wei) became strained. Although the Zizhi Tongjian states that on a number of occasions generals like Tian Yu and Liang Xi defeated Kebineng, it is highly unlikely that Kebineng's clan was completely overwhelmed every time it engaged Han and Wei troops in battle. 

On one occasion when Tian Yu went to besiege Kebineng's father-in-law for instance, Kebineng came to assist with tens of thousands of cavalry and would have defeated Tian Yu had he not been persuaded by his advisers and a diplomat, Yan Zhi, to call for a cease-fire. The power of Kebineng's tribes did not significantly wane until his death, and before his death he initiated several devastating raids on You and Bing provinces. Kebineng was ultimately assassinated by Cao Wei in 235, after which there was a period of relative peace between the Xianbei and Han Chinese for several decades.

In Romance of the Three Kingdoms
In the 14th-century historical novel Romance of the Three Kingdoms, Kebineng was an ally of the Cao Wei state against its rival state, Shu Han. Kebineng was a Xianbei chieftain bribed by Wei to assault Shu, but ended up fleeing when he learned that the Shu general Ma Chao was in command of the army dispatched to stop him. The reason it is believed he fled was because of Ma Chao's reputation a great warrior among the Qiang people, who formed the bulk of Kebineng's army.

See also
 Lists of people of the Three Kingdoms

References

 Chen, Shou (3rd century). Records of the Three Kingdoms (Sanguozhi).
 Luo, Guanzhong (14th century). Romance of the Three Kingdoms (Sanguo Yanyi).
 Pei, Songzhi (5th century). Annotations to Records of the Three Kingdoms (Sanguozhi zhu).
 Sima, Guang (1084). Zizhi Tongjian.

Year of birth unknown
235 deaths
Han dynasty warlords
Assassinated Chinese people